Moorthikuppam is a panchayat village in Ariyankuppam Commune in the Union Territory of Puducherry, India. It is also a revenue village under Ariyankuppam firka.

Geography
Poornankuppam is bordered by Chunnambar river in the north, Nallavadu in the east, Andiarpalayam in the south and Thavalakuppam in the West

Demographics
Poornankuppam has an average literacy rate of 81.49%, male literacy is 88.89%, and female literacy is 74.13%. In Poornankuppam, 10% of the population is under 6 years of age.

Transport
Poornankuppam is located at 1.5 km from Thavalakuppam on Thavalakuppam - Pudukuppam Road. One can reach Thavalakuppam by any local bus from Pondicherry to Bahoor, Madukarai and Karaiyanputtur running via Ariyankuppam. From Thavalakuppam, you have to walk 1.5 km towards east to reach Poornankuppam. Poornankuppam can also be reached directly by less frequent PRTC Bus running between Pondicherry and Pudukuppam.

Road network
Poornankuppam is connected to Pondicherry by Thavalakuppam - Pudukuppam Road.

Tourism

Sri Anagalaparameshwari Amman Kovil
The Angalaparameshwari Amman temple located in Poornankuppam is very famous. and it is next to malaiyanoor. the goddess sri angalaparameshwari amman is very powerful. and she gives all the wealth who worship her

Arulmigu Drowpathy

Amman Kovil, Poornankuppam is famous for Fire Festival and sri Angalaparameshwariamman kovil for Mayana Kollai, and 27 feet hanuman statue is located here.  Mayana kollai festival is celebrated for ten days.  It starts at maha sivarathri every year, and the festival will lie on February or March. and more than two thousand years old Sivan Temple is located in this village (Sre Ellai Easwaran kovil)

Sri Oalkur iyyannarappan kovil
The temple was built on 2003 every year the festival will be on English July month Tamil month Aadi first Monday it was located on Kamraj Palai, Pooranakuppam it was famous for the karavam festival and Iyyanarappan WEDS pushkalai and poorani thirukalayana thiruvizha natai perum

Sree Ellai Easwaran koil 
Sree Ellai Easwaran koil is built newly (which was more than 2000 years old)

Politics
Poornankuppam is part of Manavely (State Assembly Constituency) which comes under Pondicherry (Lok Sabha constituency)

References

External links
 Official website of the Government of the Union Territory of Pondicherry
 Kailash Beach Resort

Villages in Puducherry district
Ariyankuppam